A mobile museum is a museum educational outreach program that bring the museum to the people rather than vice versa. Typically they can be in Recreational Vehicles (RVs) or trucks/trailers that drive to schools, libraries and rural events. Their business model is to use grant or donor support, as they goal is to make the museum exhibit accessible to underserved populations. Below are some examples of mobile museums.

TAME Trailblazer

The Texas Alliance for Minorities in Engineering (TAME) is a nonprofit founded in 1976 that maintains two traveling STEM-museums-on-wheels that visit thousands of students a year across Texas. Established in 1980 as the Expo-Tex traveling engineering exhibit, the Trailblazer program expanded in 2013 to a fleet of two upgraded 40-ft trailers. Both Trailblazer I and Trailblazer II contain five interactive STEM exhibit areas: Aerodynamics, Biotechnology, Energy, Space, and Weather. Exhibits include Robotic Surgery, Van de Graaff Generators, Virtual Reality Spacewalk, Green Screen Technology, Thermal Imaging, Wind Tunnels, and more.

VanGo! Museum on Wheels 

The "VanGo" was founded in 1992 by the Susquehanna Art Museum in Harrisburg, Pennsylvania. The program gives visitors an authentic art museum experience on board a vehicle retrofitted with a gallery space. Since its inception, the VanGo program has occupied three vehicles: a city transportation bus, a school bus, and presently a 31-foot-long Winnebago Sightseer. Annually rotating exhibitions feature original artworks in a variety of media. In addition, visitors learn about careers, museum etiquette, and art history through a variety of interactive stations.

Moveable museum
The Moveable Museum is produced and managed by the American Museum of Natural History in New York City (NYC) under the auspices of the Gottesman Center for Science Teaching and Learning. The program is available free of charge to all schools in the five boroughs of New York City and consists of one themed vehicle outfitted with hands-on, interactive exhibits covering paleontology. The Moveable Museum formerly also included vehicles about anthropology and astronomy. The Moveable Museum program has been in operation since 1993, in which time it has visited over 700 schools in NYC and many libraries. The Paleontology of Dinosaurs (Grades K-2) has been active since 1998, and is focused on teaching children how paleontologists use fossils to study dinosaurs and other ancient life. The Structures & Culture (Grades 3–8) lets students study actual pieces of material culture, and become anthropologists and investigate how culture allows people to use various environmental resources to meet basic human needs.

The Dinosaurs: Ancient Fossils, New Discoveries and Structures & Culture was donated to the Institute for the Study of Mongolian Dinosaurs in 2013. The Paleontology of Dinosaurs is the oldest vehicle in operation. The Structures & Culture allows students to enter the homes of three modern nomadic cultures, the Gabra of Kenya, the Mongols of Mongolia and the Blackfeet of Montana.  Discovering the Universe (Grades 6–12) resides at the Suffolk County Vanderbilt Planetarium.

Other mobile museums
ANO Mobile Museum
Created to travel into communities in Ghana by Nana Oforiatta Ayim and the ANO Institute of Arts and Knowledge. In The Guardian, Charlotte Jansen writes: "Ayim said she started to reflect on the museum model in Africa while working at the British Museum. Struck by how differently African objects were encountered in display cabinets in the UK with how they were actively used in festivals back home, she began to think about how material culture could be preserved and presented in a way that was more in keeping with local traditions." 
Mundaring Travelling Museum
A purpose-built enclosed trailer featuring artefacts and photographs from the areas in the Shire of Mundaring. The Mundaring Travelling Museum was official opened at the 2019 Blue Sky Festival, by Cr John Saw (Shire President), Owen Briffa (Curator) and Matthew Hughes (MLA - Kalamunda). Located in the Perth Hills, the Travelling Museum visits schools, special celebrations and local community events.
Shark in a bus
An ex MTT Perth 1957 vintage Leyland Worldmaster Bus featuring a 5 m long great white shark (White Pointer) and hundreds of marine objects collected around Australia primarily in the 1960s and '70s. This private collection tours Australia and contains the shark purported to have inspired the artist Damien Hirst. Shark in a Bus is completely self funded.
Van of Enchantment
A pair of RV museum vans with themes related to cultural history that operates in New Mexico and is run by the New Mexico Department of Cultural Affairs, with primary funding from the Department of Transportation. The grant-supported program focuses on children in elementary schools, especially those in remote and rural communities.
Strange Old Things
Based in Wiltshire, UK, it aims to tell the story of Britain through interaction with items from various periods. It focuses on donations of items as opposed to money and operates out of a period military tent.
Go van Gogh (Dallas Museum of Art)
School outreach program targeting children in school grades 1–6, operating in North Texas, USA.

See also
 Virtual museums — museum exhibits that are online

Notes

References

External links

Strange Old Things  (official website)
Go van Gogh After School Program (official website)
TAME (official website)
Shark in a Bus (official website)
VanGo! Museum on Wheels (official website)

Types of museums
Museum education
Trucks
Trailers
Recreational vehicles
Museum educational materials
American Museum of Natural History